William F. Jackson (1850 – January 8, 1936) was an American painter and art curator.

References

1850 births
1936 deaths
People from Council Bluffs, Iowa
Artists from Sacramento, California
Painters from California
19th-century American painters
19th-century male artists
20th-century American painters